Kheyrabad is a village in north-eastern Afghanistan. It is located in Khwahan District of Badakhshan province.

References

External links

Populated places in Khwahan District